Gerhard (or Gerard) of the Moselle (Latin Gerhardus Mosellensis), Count of Metz and possibly of Alsace (approximately 970-1025), was a Lotharingian noble active in the early 11th century. He was a key figure within an alliance of Lotharingian nobles who were seen as opponents of Henry II, Holy Roman Emperor. This also put him in constant conflict with the king's loyal representatives in Lotharingia, his relatives in the family known to historians as the House of Ardenne–Verdun. Henry II was Gerhard's brother-in-law, as they had both married daughters of Count Sigfried, the ancestor of the counts of Luxembourg. He was also in the Ardenne dynasty, though his family came to be opposed to his Verdun cousins. 

Gerhard was thus a part of the rebellion of his in-laws the Luxembourg family, led by Sigfried's eldest son Henry V, Duke of Bavaria. Gerhard was also an ally of the family who had been Henry II's competitors for the throne, and who took over the crown after him, the so-called Salian dynasty. His sister's son became Conrad II, Holy Roman Emperor.

Family
Gerhard's exact parentage is uncertain, but he is considered to be a relative of the so-called  and Etichonid families.

Concerning his father, Hlawitschka has defended an early modern record which says Gerhard's father was a count of Metz named Richard. This Richard corresponds to records of a Richard in this position around 970-986, who was perhaps preceded by a count also named Gerhard. Hlawitschka proposed this Richard to be a grandson of Godfrey, Count Palatine of Lotharingia, one of whose sons (possibly the one named Gerhard) was an ancestor of Emperor Henry III, according to the eleventh-century biography of Adelaide, Abbess of Vilich. 

Hlawitschka believes Gerhard's mother was a sister of the wife of  the Etichonid count of the Nordgau in Alsace, whose son Hugh, and grandson Pope Leo IX were described in various documents as blood relatives of descendants of Gerhard and his siblings.

Gerhard's two siblings are known. 
His sister, Adelaide of Metz, married Henry of Speyer, and their son was the future king of Germany, Conrad II.
His brother Adalbert, count in the Saargau, succeeded Gerhard as Count of Metz. He is the earliest certain male-line ancestor of the main line of medieval Dukes of Lorraine (Upper Lotharingia), beginning with his grandson of the same name, Adalbert, Duke of Lorraine. Much later, the 18th-century House of Habsburg-Lorraine, were also direct descendants.

Gerhard married Eva (or Abenza), a daughter of Count Sigfried of Luxembourg. Their only known son, also named Sigfried, pre-deceased them, and their daughter Berscinda, became Abbess of Remiremont Abbey, where Gerhard was apparently the advocatus (German Vogt) of the abbey.

Proposed county of Alsace
Dietmar of Merseburg reported in his Chronicon that when Henry II claimed the crown of Germany in 1002, his main persistent opponent north of the alps was Herman II, Duke of Swabia, and that as a result of this the king gave one of Herman's counties to Count Gerhard of Alsace.

Hlawitschka has raised doubts about the traditional equation of this Gerhard of Alsace with Gerard the count of Metz, and believes this Gerhard is a first cousin, specifically a younger son of Hugh Raucus.

Alliance with Count Balderic

Some time after 1010, Alpertus of Metz described the powerful man Gerhard of the Mosel, along with Count Lambert of Leuven, as companions (clientes) of Count Balderic, whose powerbase was around the area east of Nijmegen near where the Rhine and Meuse (or Maas) rivers cross the modern border of Germany and the Netherlands. This Gerhard is generally accepted to be same one who fought Duke Godefrid the childless in 1017, whose wife was a sister of the empress. He is also equated to various records naming a Gerard who was a count of Metz. (Metz is a city on the Moselle.)

Alpertus described Gerhard as Balderic's closest friend, and said that Balderic called upon him and Lambert to besiege a new fortification made on the banks of the Meuse river, by his "Saxon" rival from north of the Rhine, . As the situation escalated Alpertus wrote that Gerhard and Lambert "said that they would endure travails and dangers" because "these two men were always prepared to stir up any kind of commotion or rebellion". However, Alpertus had more respect for other supporters of this clique during this dispute: Heribert the Bishop of Cologne; Adalbold II bishop of Utrecht; and the emperor Henry II himself (Gerhard's brother-in-law) also supposedly gave them considerable grace.

He granted Aspel (in Rees near the Lower Rhine) to his ally Balderic. However, the widow married Gebhard, who had been a soldier of Balderic, placing Gebhard in control of the two forts, and in direct conflict with his old lord Balderic. Although Count Gerhard was able to capture the fort of Heimbach, Gebhard was able to capture Balderic and ransom him, forcing him to give up his claim on Aspel.

After Balderic lost his  (probably at ), Gerhard and Heribert the bishop of Cologne helped Balderic. Dietmar names the servant as his own first cousin Berthold, a younger son of Liuthar, Margrave of the Saxon North March. This capture gave hope to Balderic but the emperor ordered the fort to be destroyed, and Gerhard was one of the magnates asked to ensure that this took place. Subsequently Gerhard arranged for the same servant to trap Gebhard, promising to get him into the fort of Heimbach, where Gerhard, who was waiting for him, was able to kill him, avenging the death of Balderic.

Conflict with Duke Godfrey

Godfrey II, Duke of Lower Lorraine "the childless" was a loyalist of Henry II who ruled Lower Lotharingia. Dietmar of Merseburg described how he defeated Count Gerhard, whose men Dietmar described as bandits, in a battle which began as a judicial duel on 27 August 1017, capturing both Count Balderic, and Gerhard's son Siegfried, who was described as the empress's nephew. With Gerhard was the future king Conrad II, the son of Count Gerhard's sister Adelaide of Metz, who Dietmar says was injured by Godfrey II's forces in 1017. Among the dead was one Walter Pulverel, a follower of Gerhard from Burgundy who, according to Dietmar, dressed as a cleric and pulverised his opponents. Dietmar also reports that only 30 of Godfrey's soldiers were killed, "admittedly among the best". The chronicle of the acts (Gesta) of the bishops of Cambrai suggests that this battle was originally planned by Gerhard as a surprise attack. It also mentions that Gerhard's son Siegfried was wounded and subsequently died. It describes Gerhard's defeat as a discouragment to rebellions which had been fomented by the sisters-in-law of Henry II, including the wife of Gerhard.

In 1018, Godfrey and Gerhard were forced to make peace by the emperor, and Balderic was also reconciled with the emperor, but Godfrey II was then crushingly defeated and captured later that year when leading imperial forces against another rebel, Dirk III, Count of Holland, whose mother, like Gerhard's wife Eva, was a sister of the emperor's wife Cunegunde.

References

Biography

Medieval works
Alpertus of Metz, De diversitate temporum:
Latin MGH edition: 
Dutch translation: 
English translation: 
Dietmar (Thietmar) of Merseburg, Chronicon:
Older Latin MGH edition:  
Newer Latin MGH edition: 
English translation: 
German translation: R. Holtzmann,Die Chronik des Bischofs Thietmar von Merseburg und ihre Korveier Überarbeitung reproduced by Trillmich in 1957.
Gesta episcoporum Cameracensium:
Latin MGH edition: 
English translation: 

Metz
Metz
History of Metz
Gerhard
970 births
1025 deaths
Year of birth uncertain